dtSearch Corp. is a software company which specializes in text retrieval software. It was founded in 1991, and is headquartered in Bethesda, Maryland. Its current range of software includes products for enterprise desktop search, Intranet/Internet spidering and search, and search engines for developers (SDK) to integrate into other software applications.

History
dtSearch Corp was founded by David Thede; the company started research and development in text retrieval in 1988  and incorporated in Virginia in 1991 as D T Software. Marketing of dtSearch 1.0 a DOS Text Retrieval software product began in the first quarter of 1991. Initially it was distributed as Association of Shareware Professionals-approved shareware. The product was featured in an article entitled "Text Retrieval Software" in an early edition of PC Magazine as a shareware alternative to the commercial products reviewed; these included ISYS, ZyIndex, Strix, askSam, ideaList, Assassin PC, Folio Views and Lotus SmartText.

In the first few years after its initial release, dtSearch was an end-user application only. Then, in 1994, Symantec approached dtSearch about including its search technology into one of the first applications for 32-bit Windows; the dtSearch end-user application was developed into a Dynamic-link library (DLL) which Symantec embedded in Norton Navigator, which was released alongside Microsoft’s initial release of its 32-bit Windows operating system, Windows 95.

In 2007 the company was listed in the EContent 100 list, a list of companies that matter most in the digital content industry.

Products
The current (v 7.9x) product range is Unicode-based and has an index that can handle over 1 TB of data per index.

Products for End-users
dtSearch Desktop with Spider -  Windows client Desktop search software (32-bit and 64-bit indexers)
dtSearch Network with Spider -  as dtSearch Desktop but licensed for Network use (32-bit and 64-bit indexers)
dtSearch Web with Spider -  browser based search-only client for Intranet/Internet usage based on Microsoft IIS (32- and 64-bit indexers)

Products for Software Developers
dtSearch Engine for Windows - SDK with C++, .NET, COM, Java, Delphi APIs (32-bit and 64-bit versions)
dtSearch Engine for Linux - SDK with C++ and Java APIs
dtSearch Engine for Mac - SDK with C++ and Java APIs
dtSearch Publish  - a search front-end for CD/DVD publishing (32- and 64-bit indexers)
Document Filters - included with all products but available for separate licensing.

See also
 Enterprise search
 List of search engines#Desktop search engines
 List of search engine software#Commercial

References

External links
Company Website
Product description on SearchTools.com 
The index is mightier than the sword - Windows IT Pro. August 27, 2008
Desktop search gets down to business - InfoWorld. September 01, 2005
Integrating Query of Relational and Textual Data in Clinical Databases - J Am Med Inform Assoc. 2003 Jan–Feb
Informatics in Radiology. Render: An Online Searchable Radiology Study Repository - RadioGraphics 2009; 29:1233–1246 
Use Of Intelligent Computer Search for the Patterns of Abnormal Lymphatic Uptake by F-18 FDG PET in Primary Lung Cancers - J Med Sci 2006;26(6):199-204

Desktop search engines
Information retrieval organizations
Software companies based in Maryland
Software companies of the United States
Software companies established in 1991